Mond may refer to:

Science and industry
 MOND (Modified Newtonian dynamics), a proposed adjustment to the classical inverse-square law of gravity
 Mond gas, a cheap form of coal gas
 Mond Nickel Company, a defunct mining company
 Brunner Mond, a chemicals company
 Der Mond, a 1837 description of the Moon by Johann Heinrich von Mädler and Wilhelm Beer

Other
 Mond (playing card), a trump card in Tarock games
 Mond (surname)
 Mond River, a river in Iran
 Der Mond, an opera in one act

See also
 Mond Mond Mond , a German television series